Jan Luggenhölscher (born 1980) is a German professional ice dancer. He competed with Jill Vernekohl, with whom he was the 1998 German junior national champion and competed on the Junior Grand Prix.

He received a training in acting and played among others in the popular German soap opera Gute Zeiten, schlechte Zeiten (Good Times, Bad Times) and Fear.

In October 2006, he appeared in the RTL television show Dancing on Ice together with the German pop singer Michelle. Jan Luggenhölscher's second appearance was in January 2007 in the Turkish version of Dancing on Ice on the Show TV with his partner, the belly dancer Asena.

References 

1980 births
Living people
German male ice dancers
Participants in German reality television series